Naval Commandos is a Shaw Brothers film directed by Chang Cheh, who is famous for his martial arts cinematography, but ventured into military combat action with the production of this war movie based upon the War of Resistance/WWII (1937-45).

Plot

The Chinese Navy led by its captain (Ti Lung) is attempting to defend its coastline from a Japanese attack, they send their commando unit led by Szu Shih into the mainland to enlist help to thwart the Japanese before they attack. Japanese officers have been hanging out in a place owned by David Chiang and his hot-headed body guard Fu Sheng but they are secretly opposed to the Japanese. The commandos enlist the help of Chiang and Sheng to kill the Japanese officers led by Shan Mao and destroy their attacking ships.

Cast
 Liu Yung - Chinese Navy Admiral Vice-Admiral An Chi Pang
 Ti Lung – Chinese Navy Captain Liang Kuan Chin
 David Chiang – Shanghai Boss Song San
 Fu Sheng – Shanghai resistance fighter Shiao Liu
 Chi Kuan-Chun - Chinese Navy Captain Hu Ching Yuan 
 Shih Szu – Shanghai resistance movement leader Cui Hsia
 Kuo Chui – Naval Commando Sgt. Shu Kuan
 Chiang Sheng – Naval Commando Sgt. Chiang Ping Kuang
 Lu Feng - Naval Commando Sgt. Shu Shiang-Lin
 Tang Yen-Tsan - Naval Commando Sgt. Shao Kang Fa
 Shan Mao – Japanese Naval Captain Hiroda

External links
 

1977 films
Kung fu films
Mandarin-language films
Hong Kong martial arts films
1977 martial arts films
Shaw Brothers Studio films
Films directed by Chang Cheh
1970s Hong Kong films
Second Sino-Japanese War films